This is a list of Canadian producers.

A
 Alistair Abell
 David Acomba
 Alfons Adetuyi
 Robert Adetuyi
 Marc Almon
 Paul Apak Angilirq
 Denys Arcand
 Paul Arcand
 Shawn Ashmore
 Melissa Auf der Maur
 Gerald Auger
 Matt Austin
 Roger Avary
 Barry Avrich

B
Julie Baldassi (film)
Roman Bittman (film, television)
Roger Blais 
Howard Busgang (television)

C
Pierre Cossette
Marie-Hélène Cousineau (film)

D
Bryan Demore (film)
Miranda de Pencier (film, television)
Nicholas de Pencier (film, television)
Luc Déry (film)
Sonya Di Rienzo (film)
Damon D'Oliveira (film, television)
Trish Dolman (film, television)
Mike Downie (documentary)
Fanny Drew (film)
Dominique Dussault (film)

E
Pierre Even (film)

F
Doug Falconer (film, television)
Sandra Faire (television)
Ina Fichman (documentary)
Niv Fichman (film)
Camelia Frieberg (film)

G
Sam Grana (film, television)
Evan Goldberg
Harold Greenberg

H
Étienne Hansez (film)
Denis Héroux (film)
Justine Héroux (film, television)

K
Martin Katz (film)
Anthony Kramreither (film)

L
John Labow (television)
Robert Lantos (film)
Yanick Létourneau (film)

M
Sarah Mannering (film)
Bill Marshall (film)
Trevor Matthews
Louis B. Mayer (film)
Kim McCraw (film)

N
Aubrey Nealon (television)

O
Hany Ouichou (film)

P
Gharrett Patrick Paon (film)
Lew Parry (film)
Martin Paul-Hus (film)
Patricia Phillips (documentary)
Noah Pink (television)
Christina Piovesan (film, television)
Aeschylus Poulos (film)

R
Odessa Rae (documentary)
Ménaïc Raoul (film)

S
Phil Savath (film, television)
Mary Sexton (film, television)
Michael Spencer (film)
Rebecca Steele (film, television)

T
Kevin Tierney (film)
Todd Thicke (television)
Gabrielle Tougas-Fréchette (film)

V
Henk Van der Kolk (film)
Clement Virgo (film)

W
Ron Weyman (television)
Stefan Wodoslawsky (film, television)
Tara Woodbury (film, television)

Z
Moses Znaimer (television)

References 

Producers